Anne Sheehan is a geologist known for her research using seismometer data to examine changes in the Earth's crust and mantle.

Education and career 
Sheehan has a B.S. from the University of Kansas (1984) and earned her Ph.D. from Massachusetts Institute of Technology in 1991. Following her Ph.D, she was a postdoc at Lamont–Doherty Earth Observatory and the University of Nevada, Reno. In 1993 she moved to the University of Colorado Boulder, where she was promoted to professor in 2006.

In 2014 Sheehan was elected a fellow of the American Geophysical Union who cited her "for developing methods to image the Earth using seismometer arrays, to explain deformation processes of mountains, oceanic, and continental plates."

Research 
Sheehan's research centers on the Earth's crust and mantle with a focus on formation of the lithosphere and the impact of Induced seismicity. She uses field data collected from seismic instruments deployed in a variety of locations including oceanic lithosphere near the Bermuda Rise and the East Pacific Rise, the subduction zone near New Zealand, and the Sierra Nevada mountain range in California. Her research on the impact of induced seismicity describes the process by which earthquakes occur following fluid injection. While Sheehan was working with ocean-bottom seismometers in New Zealand she realized that small waves detected by the instruments could be expanded to outfit cargo ships with instrumentation to detecting tsunamis. This research would benefit coastal communities in the path of tsunamis formed after earthquakes at the seafloor.

Selected publications

Awards and honors 
Fellow, American Geophysical Union (2014)
EarthScope Distinguished Lecturer (2013)
New Zealand Geophysics Prize, Geoscience Society of New Zealand for papers in 2016 and 2019

References

External links 
 

Fellows of the American Geophysical Union
University of Kansas alumni
Massachusetts Institute of Technology alumni
University of Colorado Boulder faculty
Living people
Women geologists
Seismologists
Year of birth missing (living people)